The Woman and the Car: A Chatty Little Handbook for all Women Who Motor or Who Want to Motor is a book by Dorothy Levitt, first published in 1909.

Autobiographical background
From 1903 until 1908 Levitt wrote a motoring column for The Graphic, an illustrated weekly newspaper, a series that formed the basis of The Woman and the Car. Levitt's handbook was not the first targeted at women motorists – English writer Eliza Davis Aria had published Woman and the Motorcar: Being the Autobiography of an Automobilist in 1906 for instance – but it was the most widely circulated of its day.

Contents
In her introductory chapter Levitt sets the scene by explaining that she is not writing for the benefit of those women who have already taken to motoring; her target audience is instead "those [women] who would like to, but either dare not because of nervousness, or who imagine it is too difficult to understand the many necessary technical details". Photographs illustrating the topics that Levitt describes, including recommended motoring dress, adjusting the footbrake and changing a spark plug were taken by Horace Nicholls.

The Car – There are scores of makes, good, bad and indifferent. I tried many cars and have come to the conclusion that the De Dion is the ideal, single cylinder car for a woman to drive.... The single cylinder car is the most economical to run. The horse-power is usually 8 h.p. or less. As regards carriage work, the Victoria type of body has the most graceful lines. Such a car as I have described will cost, new, from 230 pounds.... The price however is for the car itself, accessories bring up the cost. 

Starting a Car – In the front you will notice a handle. Push it inwards until you feel it fit into a notch, then pull it sharply, releasing your hold of the handle the minute you feel you have pulled it over the resisting point....on no account press down on the handle – always pull it upwards smartly. If it is pressed down the possibility of backfire is greater – and a broken arm may result.

Changing Speed – In changing speed always remember to throttle slightly... Never change from first to top speed without using the intermediate speed. The first speed on these little cars is 0–9 miles an hour, the second is 9–18 and the top is 18–28. I should advise you to thoroughly get used to the steering while on second speed... Bear in mind that when riding or driving a horse, it is only partly under your control. As it has a brain... but with a motor-car, you can rely upon yourself alone.

The Mirror – The mirror should be fairly large to be really useful and it is better to have one with a handle. Just before starting take the glass out of the little drawer and put it into the little flap pocket of the car. You will find it useful to  have handy, not only for personal use, but to occasionally hold up to see what is behind you.

Motor Manners – Pedestrians, according to the law, practically own the highways... Dogs, chickens and other domestic animals at large are not pedestrians, and if one is driving at a regulation speed ... one is not responsible for their untimely end.
It is advisable to drive slowly through all towns and villages. Drive slowly past all school houses... Drive slowly past anyone driving or riding a horse and if a lady or child is on top, stop the engine. It is an act of courtesy. Do not fail to sound the hooter and slacken speed when coming to a cross road. Never take a sharp corner at full speed. Never drive the engine downhill. Do not leave the engine running when stopping outside a house.

Self-defence – "If you are going to drive alone in the highways and byways it might be advisable to carry a small revolver. I have an automatic "Colt", and find it very easy to handle as there is practically no recoil – a great consideration to a woman."

What to Wear – An all important question is dress. With an open car, neatness and comfort are essential. Under no circumstance wear lace or fluffy adjuncts to your toilet. There is nothing like a thick frieze, homespun or tweed coat lined with fur. Do not heed the cry, 'nothing like leather.' Leather coats do not wear gracefully. One of the  most important articles of wear is a scarf or muffler for the neck. Regarding gloves – never wear woollen gloves, but gloves made of good soft kid. You will find room for these gloves in the little drawer under the seat of the car. It is not advisable to wear rings. Indispensable to the motorist is the 'overall,' this should be made of butcher blue linen in the same shape as an artist's overall.

References

Citations

Bibliography

1909 non-fiction books
Books about cars

External links